Alison Shanks (born 13 December 1982) is a retired New Zealand professional racing cyclist, specialising in individual pursuit in track cycling and individual time trial in road bicycle racing. Prior to that she was an Otago Rebels netballer, the sport she played for more than five years before her cycling career.

Cycling career
Shanks began cycling in 2005, and soon enjoyed success. After more than five years competing for the Otago Rebels in the National Bank Cup netball, she competed at the 2006 Commonwealth Games in Melbourne where she finished fourth in the pursuit. She placed eighth in the pursuit during her first appearance at the World Championships in 2006, and improved on this to finish seventh in 2007.

Shanks competed at the 2008 Summer Olympics in the Individual Pursuit, where she placed 4th overall after being defeated by Lesya Kalytovska of the Ukraine in the bronze medal match. Prior to this, in defeating Sarah Hammer of the United States in her semifinal, she set a new personal best of 3:32.478 minutes.

She began her 2009 season by competing in the 2008–2009 UCI Track Cycling World Cup Classics in Beijing, she lowered her personal best once more with a time of 3:30.685 to take the gold medal. Shanks also rode the team pursuit with Kaytee Boyd and Lauren Ellis, in a time of 3:28.044, becoming the fastest qualifiers. They went on to take the gold medal in a time of 3:24.421, setting the second fastest time in the world behind the 3:22.425 world record set by Great Britain at Manchester in 2008.

Shanks then continued her great form by winning the 2009 UCI Track Cycling World Championships Individual Pursuit in Pruskow, Poland on 25 March in a time of 3:29.807 beating Wendy Houvenaghel of Great Britain.

At the 2010 Commonwealth Games, Shanks won a gold medal for the Cycling Track 3000m Individual Pursuit Women. She just nudged out Wendy Houvenaghel of Northern Ireland with a time of 3:30.875. She is due to race in the Cycling Road 29 km Individual Time Trial Women on Wednesday 13 October.

In 2012, she finished second at the individual pursuit at the Track Cycling World Cup in London.  Then on 8 April 2012 Shanks won Gold in the Individual Pursuit at the UCI Track Cycling World Championships in Melbourne, Australia with a time of 3:30.199.

At the 2012 Summer Olympics, she competed in the Women's team pursuit for the national team. Shanks retired from professional cycling early in 2014. She has since moved to Cambridge.

Personal life
Born in Dunedin, New Zealand, on 13 December 1982, Shanks graduated from the University of Otago in 2005 with a BCom(Hons) in marketing and a BSc in human nutrition.

References

External links 

1982 births
Living people
New Zealand female cyclists
Cyclists at the 2008 Summer Olympics
Cyclists at the 2012 Summer Olympics
Olympic cyclists of New Zealand
University of Otago alumni
UCI Track Cycling World Champions (women)
Cyclists at the 2010 Commonwealth Games
Commonwealth Games gold medallists for New Zealand
Sportspeople from Dunedin
Commonwealth Games medallists in cycling
New Zealand track cyclists
Otago Rebels players
Medallists at the 2010 Commonwealth Games